A participation trophy is a trophy given to children (usually) who participate in any sport event or contest but do not finish in first, second or third place, and so would not normally be eligible for a trophy. It is frequently associated with millennials, those of Generation Y.

The use of participation trophies has caused some controversy: 

 Critics argue that they promote narcissism and entitlement among children to whom they are given, and are based on incorrect assumptions regarding supposed psychological benefits of self-esteem. Critics also note that some children also do not value them as much as they do "normal" trophies that are given to winners. 

 Defenders of participation trophies argue that they teach children that trying their best is good enough, even if they do not win.

One of the earliest known mentions of the term participation trophy occurred in a newspaper in Massillon, Ohio, United States, called the Evening Independent, on 8 February 1922.

See also 

 Self esteem
 Competition
 Sport
 Game

References

Children's sport
Trophies